Ambrose Hickey (1945 – 10 June 2016) was an Irish Gaelic footballer who played as a midfielder and centre-forward for the Offaly senior team.

Born in Daingean, County Offaly, Hickey first played competitive Gaelic football in his youth. He came to prominence while simultaneously enjoying championship successes at underage levels with the Daingean club. Hickey later won a championship medal with the Daingean senior team.

Hickey made his senior debut during the 1964-65 league. He went on to play a key role for Offaly at midfield, and won one Leinster medal and one National Football League Division 4 medal. He was an All-Ireland runner-up on one occasion.

Throughout his inter-county career Hickey made 10 championship appearances. He retired from inter-county football during the 1969-70 league.

Career statistics

Honours

 Daingean
 Offaly Senior Football Championship (1): 1965
 Offaly Minor Football Championship (1): 1962

 Offaly
 Leinster Senior Football Championship (1): 1969
 National Football League Division 4 (1): 1968-69

References

1945 births
2016 deaths
Daingean Gaelic footballers
Offaly inter-county Gaelic footballers